D.Y. Patil College of Engineering and Technology is a private college located in Kasaba Bavda, Kolhapur, Maharashtra, India. It is affiliated with Shivaji University.

History
The college was established by Padmashri recipient Dnyandeo Yashawantrao Patil in 1984.

References

External links
 

Engineering colleges in Maharashtra
Shivaji University
Education in Kolhapur
Educational institutions established in 1984
1984 establishments in Maharashtra